Aleksandre "Aleksi" Machavariani (23 September 1913 – 30 December 1995) was a Georgian composer and conductor.

Aleksi Machavariani was born in Gori, Georgia. He graduated from the Tbilisi Conservatory in 1936 and remained there for postgraduate studies. He studied composition under Pyotr Ryazanov. Later he joined the faculty, becoming a professor in 1963. He began his artistic career in 1935.
 
Machavariani produced a number of critically acclaimed plays and ballets, including the ballet "Othello" (1957) and "Hamlet" (~1964), the operas "Mat i Sin" (1945), "Den moei Rodini" (1954), the symphony "Piat monologov" (1971; it earned the Shota Rustaveli Prize). He also wrote the music to many theatrical productions, including "Baratashvili" and "Legenda o liubvi". His output includes among other works also a violin concerto (1950), seven symphonies (1947–1992) and six string quartets (the last in 1993).

He was the artistic director of the Georgian State Symphony Orchestra from 1956 till 1958 and directed the Composers' Union of Georgia from 1962 till 1968.

His son, Vakhtang Machavariani, is likewise a composer, who also conducts his father's works.

In 2007, a street in Tbilisi was named after him.

References

Notes

Further reading
 Manana Kordsaia: Alexi Matchavariani: der Komponist und seine Zeit, ed. Vakhtang Matchavariani ; translated from Georgian into German by Natia Mikeladse-Bachsoliani, Hofheim: Wolke, 2015,

External links

1913 births
1995 deaths
20th-century composers
20th-century conductors (music)
Burials at Didube Pantheon
Composers from Georgia (country)
Conductors (music) from Georgia (country)
People from Gori, Georgia